Giant Little Ones is a 2018 Canadian drama film, written and directed by Keith Behrman. The film stars Kyle MacLachlan and Maria Bello as the parents of a teenage boy (Josh Wiggins), whose lives are upended after their son and a friend are involved in an intimate incident after a party.

The film was shot in Sault Ste. Marie, Ontario, in 2017. It premiered on September 9 at the 2018 Toronto International Film Festival, and received a limited release in the United States on March 1, 2019. In December 2018, the Toronto International Film Festival named the film to its annual year-end Canada's Top Ten list. Behrman won the Vancouver Film Critics Circle award for Best Screenplay for a Canadian Film.

Plot
Ray Winter leaves his wife, Carly, for another man. Ray's popular, athletic son, Franky, refuses to talk to his father despite Ray's pleas. Some time later, Franky is about to celebrate his birthday. His best friend, fellow swimmer Ballas Kohl, pressures Franky to sleep with his girlfriend Priscilla just as Ballas and his girlfriend, Jess, have done. Ballas boasts of having had sex repeatedly. After Franky's birthday party and while intoxicated, Ballas and Franky have a sexual experience with each other. Ballas is terrified that his actions have outed him, and he and his girlfriend begin to spread rumors that Franky acted solely and performed unwanted oral sex while Ballas was sleeping. This results in Priscilla angrily confronting Franky and breaking up with him without allowing him to explain what had really happened.

Ballas’ and Franky’s friendship falls apart in the weeks that follow, with everyone in school believing that Franky is gay. This causes him to abandon the swimming team and spend more time alone with himself. Only his transgender friend Mouse and Ballas’ sister Natasha, who was also branded as an outcast after being sexually assaulted at a party, know the truth about what had happened between the two boys after the party and that Ballas had initially came on to him. Natasha and Franky form a close relationship with each other, which angers Ballas and causes him to threaten Franky to stay from his sister.

Ballas damages Franky’s bike, but is eventually forced to pay for the bike's repair by his parents. Franky steals his bike in retaliation, later claiming to not know the bike's whereabouts. Ballas then tries lying to Natasha, saying that Franky is only using her to prove he's straight, but she refuses to believe him. When this doesn’t work, he drunkenly confronts Franky outside a convenience store and berates him, beating him up before running away. This results in the police being called, to which Natasha overhears Ballas’ confessions to the police and spreads the truth about Ballas and Franky to the entire school. Ballas is soon branded as an outcast and is dumped by Jess when she finds out the truth.

Franky slowly begins to piece his life back together with the support of Mouse and rejoins the swimming team.  He also rekindles his relationship with Natasha, much to the regret of Priscilla, having also learned the truth about Franky. Franky reconnects with Ray, and admits that he is uncertain about his sexuality, as he did not feel uncomfortable during the incident with Ballas. Ray, who is gay and only came out long into adulthood, points out that he may not know his full truth yet, but he need not rush to immediately define himself. Through this guidance and the support of his family and friends, Franky finds himself confident in moving forward in life.

Some time later, it is revealed that Franky had broken apart Ballas' bike into parts and hid it away. He builds it back together with Ray's help and returns it to Ballas' house, alongside a dog tag necklace Jess gave to Ballas and he had lost during Franky's birthday party. As Franky leaves on his bike he fires a flare gun Ballas gave to him as a birthday present, which Ballas and Natasha see from afar.

Cast
 Josh Wiggins as Franky Winter
 Darren Mann as Ballas Kohl, Franky's lifelong best friend
 Taylor Hickson as Natasha Kohl, Ballas's younger sister and Franky’s new girlfriend
 Kyle MacLachlan as Ray Winter, Franky's father
 Maria Bello as Carly Winter, Franky's mother
 Peter Outerbridge as Nic Kohl
 Niamh Wilson as Mouse, Franky's female friend
 Kiana Madeira as Jess, Ballas' girlfriend and later ex-girlfriend 
 Hailey Kittle as Priscilla, Franky's girlfriend and later ex-girlfriend
 Stephanie Moore as Angie Kohl
 Evan Marsh as Connor
 Olivia Scriven as Deanne Winter, Franky’s sister
 Carson MacCormac as Michael, a bullied boy

Critical response
Giant Little Ones received positive reviews. On the website Rotten Tomatoes, the film has  approval rating, based on  reviews. The website's consensus reads, "Giant Little Ones puts a complex and refreshingly nuanced spin on the traditional coming of age drama, further elevated by the admirable efforts of a talented cast." On Metacritic, the film has a weighted average score of 67 out of 100, based on 17 critics, indicating "generally favorable reviews."

Writing for CBC Arts in his regular Queeries column on LGBTQ entertainment, Peter Knegt praised the film as part of a rising and necessary trend of honest depictions of teenage sexuality and sexual identity issues. He wrote that the film "feels like something of an antidote to last year's gay teen rom-com Love, Simon, which felt like it barely scratched the surface of what its characters were going through."

References
Notes

Citations

External links
 
 

2018 films
Canadian drama films
English-language Canadian films
Films shot in Sault Ste. Marie, Ontario
Films directed by Keith Behrman
Canadian LGBT-related films
LGBT-related drama films
2018 LGBT-related films
Bisexuality-related films
Gay-related films
LGBT-related coming-of-age films
Juvenile sexuality in films
2010s coming-of-age drama films
2010s English-language films
2010s Canadian films
2018 independent films